Pingshan may refer to the following locations in China:

Pingshan County, Hebei, county of Shijiazhuang City
Pingshan County, Sichuan, county of Yibin City
Pingshan District, Benxi, Benxi, Liaoning
Pingshan District, Shenzhen, Shenzhen, Guangdong
Pingshan, Chongqing

Subdistricts
Pingshan Subdistrict, Huainan, in Xiejiaji District, Huainan, Anhui
Pingshan Subdistrict, Huidong County, Guangdong
Pingshan Subdistrict, Guilin, in Xiangshan District, Guilin, Guangxi
Pingshan Subdistrict, Benxi, in Pingshan District, Benxi, Liaoning
Pingshan Subdistrict, Fushun, in Dongzhou District, Fushun, Liaoning

Towns
Pingshan, Huaining County, Anhui
Pingshan, Gaozhou, Guangdong
Pingshan, Lingshan County, Guangdong
Pingshan, Luzhai County, Guangdong
Pingshan, Pingnan County, Guangdong
Pingshan, Pingshan County, Hebei
Pingshan, Harbin, in Acheng District, Harbin, Heilongjiang
Pingshan, Lanxi County, Heilongjiang

Townships
Pingshan Township, Fujian, in Datian County
Pingshan Township, Guangxi, in Long'an County
Written as "":
Pingshan Township, Guizhou, in Hezhang County
Pingshan Township, Hunan, in Zhuzhou County
Pingshan Township, Inner Mongolia, in Jarud Banner
Pingshan Township, Jiangsu, in Hanjiang District, Yangzhou
Pingshan Township, Yunnan, in Lianghe County